Total Sports TV is an online live sports streaming channel that is a partnership between  Total Sports Asia and Octopus Media Technology. The channel was launched in July 2009 serving live sports content like the Thomas Cup & Uber Cup, Badminton World Championships and US Open Tennis.
Its existing live streaming rights are restricted in selected territories. In 2011, Total Sports TV will stream the Badminton Super Series and AIBA Boxing worldwide.

2010 Badminton Thomas & Uber Cup
From 9 May 2010 to 16 May 2010, Total Sports TV streamed the Thomas Cup and Uber Cup badminton matches live on its platform, serving to Badminton fans in Asia. It also provided a live commentary service from the venue itself to its subscribers.

2010 Badminton World Championships
Total Sports TV streamed the 2010 Badminton World Championships in Paris from 23 August 2010 to 29 August 2010 to selected territories in Asia. The live streaming service was provided for free in the early stages of the tournament with a subscription of USD1.99 charged from quarterfinals onwards. The site generated over 33,000 unique visitors, with 248,000 pageviews, generating over 6000 new subscribers.

Available Territories: Singapore, Malaysia, Brunei, Thailand, Indonesia, Philippines, Vietnam, China, Hong Kong, Macao, Taiwan, India, Nepal, Pakistan, Sri Lanka, Bangladesh, Uzbekistan, Saudi Arabia, United Arab Emirates, Kuwait, Jordan, Bahrain, Dubai, Iran, Iraq, Oman, Lebanon, Qatar, Yemen, Australia, New Zealand, South Korea.

Video On Demand Content
Also available are on-demand programming that includes Air sports, Professional Arm Wrestling League, D1 Grand Prix, Aero GP, IBUKI Pro Wrestling, Double Dutch Jump Rope, Adventure Race World Championship Portugal, Badminton Archives, Muay Thai, Euro Hockey League Final Four, Superleague Formula, Asia-Pacific Rally Championship, professional bodybuilding, Powerboat P1 Superstock Championship and martial arts.

References
*Total Sports TV Streams Adventure Sports from Dream Team TV
Total Sports TV Teams Up With EHL To Bring European Hockey to Asia
Total Sports Asia Links Up with Martial Arts TV for a double impact on Media Distribution & Total Sports TV
Professional Armwrestling Hooks up with Total Sports TV
Air Sports TV flies with Total Sports TV in Asia
BWF Appoints World Super Series Agencies
Total Sports Wins Boxing Rights From AIBA
Total Sports TV to Stream Badminton World Championships & US Open Tennis Live Online

External links
 Total Sports TV
 US Open Official Site
 Badminton World Federation
 AIBA International Boxing Association

Sports television in Malaysia